Rice and peas (or peas and rice) is a traditional food within the West Indian Caribbean islands. The 'peas' are traditionally pigeon peas, but more often substituted with kidney beans, and the dish is frequently served with curry goat. 

In 1961, Frederic G. Cassidy made note that the dish had been referred to as Jamaica's coat of arms.

Anglo-Caribbean
Rice and peas is the mainstay of the cuisines of The Bahamas, Jamaica, Barbados, Haiti and many other English-speaking Caribbean islands. In The Bahamas, it is known as peas n' rice, from which the Bahamian folk song "Mamma don't want no Peas n' Rice and Coconut Oil" is named. 
The dish is made with rice and any available legume, such as kidney beans, pigeon peas (known as gungo peas), or cowpeas, the combination of grain and a legume forming a complete protein; compare rice and beans. Gungo peas are particularly associated with Christmas.  The peas are boiled with pimenta seeds and garlic until tender. Scotch bonnet pepper, thyme, scallions and/or round onions, grated ginger and coconut milk are then added along with the rice and left to simmer until cooked.

Variations of the recipe include the use of salt pork or beef instead of salt. Chicken is also used in the Guyanese variations of this dish and is known as cookup rice. This flavors the dish well and reduces the need for additional protein.

Rice and peas, the classic Sunday lunch dish, is usually served with a stewed meat, such as chicken, beef, lamb or pork, or fish or seafood such as shrimp, crab or king fish.

See also

 Arroz con pollo
 Arroz con gandules
 Gallo Pinto
 Hoppin' John
 List of Jamaican dishes
 List of legume dishes
 List of rice dishes
 Pabellón criollo
 Platillo Moros y Cristianos
 Rice and beans
 Stew peas

References

Caribbean cuisine
Jamaican cuisine
Trinidad and Tobago cuisine
Barbadian cuisine
Bahamian cuisine
Guyanese cuisine
Legume dishes
Food combinations
Lunch dishes
National dishes